Lenzburg District is a district of the Canton of Aargau in Switzerland, lying at the center of the canton. The district capital is the town of Lenzburg.

Geography
Of this area,  or 41.5% is used for agricultural purposes, while  or 33.2% is forested. Of the rest of the land,  or 19.6% is settled (buildings or roads).

Coat of arms
The blazon of the district coat of arms is Argent a Hurt.

Demographics
, 19.7% of the population are foreign nationals.

Economy
 there were 24,407 workers who lived in the district.  Of these, 18,072 or about 74.0% of the residents worked outside the Lenzburg district while 14,959 people commuted into the district for work.  There were a total of 21,294 jobs (of at least 6 hours per week) in the district.

Religion
Of the rest of the population, there were 45 individuals (or about 0.10% of the population) who belonged to the Christian Catholic faith.

Education
Of the school age population, there are 3,695 students attending primary school, there are 1,569 students attending secondary school, there are 971 students attending tertiary or university level schooling, and there are 12 students who are seeking a job after school in the municipality.

Municipalities
The district contains a total of 20 municipalities:

References

Districts of Aargau